The human ARHGEF10 gene encodes the protein Rho guanine nucleotide exchange factor 10.

Rho GTPases play a fundamental role in numerous cellular processes that are initiated by extracellular stimuli that work through G protein coupled receptors. The encoded protein may form a complex with G proteins and stimulate Rho-dependent signals.

References

External links

Further reading